Sarah Jane Cook (born 13 February 1975) is a squash player from New Zealand. She reached a highest ranking of 22nd in November 1995. She won a bronze medal in the mixed doubles at the 1998 Commonwealth Games, partnering Glen Wilson.

References

External links 
 

1975 births
Living people
New Zealand female squash players
Commonwealth Games bronze medallists for New Zealand
Commonwealth Games medallists in squash
Squash players at the 1998 Commonwealth Games
20th-century New Zealand women
21st-century New Zealand women
Medallists at the 1998 Commonwealth Games